Greek Basketball Championship career statistical leaders are the all-time stats leaders of the top-tier level Greek Basketball Championship, since the league first formed its A National Category, starting with the 1963–64 season. The all-time stats leaders are divided into separate categories, based on total stats counted since the A National Category of the league was first formed, beginning with the 1963–64 season, total stats counted since the A1 National Category was first formed, beginning with the 1986–87 season, and total stats counted since the 1992–93 season, when the league first became recognized by FIBA as a fully and entirely 100% professional league of basketball.

Career stats for the Greek Basket League's history are only officially counted since the 1992–93 season (the professional era of the competition).

A National Category all-time stats leaders since the 1963–64 season

 This counts all the stats since the Alpha (A) National Category was formed, starting with the 1963–64 season.
 Counting only games played in the A Division, and not counting any games played in the A2 Division or the Greek Cup:
 1963–64 to 1985–86: A National Category
 1986–87 to 1991–92: A1 National Category
 1992–93 to 2009–10: HEBA A1
 2010–11 to present: Greek Basket League

Points Scored

Most points scored in one game

Head coaches with the most games coached in the A National Category since the 1963–64 season
(through 2022–23 season):
 *Denotes active head coaches:

A1 National Category all-time cumulative stats leaders since the 1986–87 season

 This counts only the stats since the two divisions were formed, starting with the 1986–87 season.
 Counting only games played in the A1 Division, and not counting any games played in the A2 Division or the Greek Cup:
 1986–87 to 1991–92: A1 National Category
 1992–93 to 2009–10: HEBA A1
 2010–11 to present: Greek Basket League
 *Currently Active Players in the A1 Division (Greek Basket League)
Last update: (through 2022–23 season)

Games Played

Points Scored

Total Rebounds

Assists

Steals

Blocks

3 pointers made

International players with the most games played since the 1986–87 season
A1 National Category all-time cumulative stats leaders.

Some players also have dual nationality, which is noted in those cases.
Last update: (through 2022–23 season)

Top scoring international players since the 1986–87 season
A1 National Category all-time cumulative stats leaders.

Some players also have dual nationality, which is noted in those cases.
Last update: (through 2022–23 season)

HEBA professional era all-time cumulative stats leaders since the 1992–93 season

References

External links
Official HEBA Site 
Greek Basket League Official English Site 
Insports.gr Greek League First Scorers In Points 
Sport24.gr Greek League Season By Season Best Performers 
Eurobasket.com Greek A1 League By Season
Galanis Sports Data

statistical leaders
Basketball statistics